Wingaroo Nature Reserve is a protected natural area in the northern part of Flinders Island. Covering 9144 hectares, it contains heath, woodland and wetland, and is home to rare populations of horny cone-bush (Isopogon ceratophyllus), saw banksia (Banksia serrata) and Oyster Bay pine (Callitris rhomboidea), as well as New Holland mouse (Pseudomys novaehollandiae). Initially 202 hectares were established as a protected area in November 1988, before it became Wingaroo Nature Reserve in September 1991 with an  additional 8942 hectares were added, bringing it to its current size.

See also
 Protected areas of Tasmania (Australia)

References

Flinders Island